Léo Lacroix (born 26 November 1937) was a French alpine skier who competed in the 1960s. Competing in two Winter Olympics, he won a silver medal in the men's downhill event at Innsbruck in 1964.

Lacroix took the Olympic Oath at the 1968 Winter Olympics in Grenoble.

References

1937 births
Alpine skiers at the 1964 Winter Olympics
Alpine skiers at the 1968 Winter Olympics
French male alpine skiers
Living people
Olympic alpine skiers of France
Olympic medalists in alpine skiing
Medalists at the 1964 Winter Olympics
Olympic silver medalists for France
Oath takers at the Olympic Games
20th-century French people